María Teresa Muñoz Guillén, (born in Sariñena, Huesca, Spain) is a world recognized textile artist whose works are exhibited in Europe, the Americas, Asia and the Middle East. 

 She resides and works in New York, Naples (FL) and Zaragoza and is best known for the creation and restoration of textile art in classic and contemporary styles. Ms. Muñoz Guillén is credited for having recovered and refined the original medieval textile art and executed it with antique and modern noble materials. Her work adorns government institutions and private collections.

Works 
Muñoz Guillén's tapestries and restorations are permanently exhibited in the central government and autonomous communities of Spain, France and Italy, as well as in financial institutions, European universities, museums, churches, basilicas, cathedrals and monasteries and she has done commissions for other government institutions and private collections from Spain, USA, Canada, Switzerland, Uruguay, UK, France, Colombia, Latvia, Italy, Japan, The Philippines, North Macedonia and Sweden. In 2018, Muñoz Guillén showed her work at Vatican's Palazzo della Cancelleria in Rome. María Teresa Muñoz Guillén was the first contemporary women textile artist to exhibit in the Vatican. 

Her works includes the realization of the Coat of arms of Aragon in original medieval techniques. The tapestry was commissioned by the parliament of Aragón (Aragonese Corts) and presented at the first official visit of Prince Felipe de Borbón (now King Felipe VI of Spain) who praised Muñoz Guillén's realization. Her work  presided the parliamentary sessions in the Palace of the Aljafería from 2000 to 2006 when it was removed after a polemic about motifs considered offensive by some politicians. At that time, Muñoz Guillén made a spirited defense of her work and its symbolic value. In 2015, the tapestry was returned to its original place in the plenary hall and presides again over the parliamentary sessions of the Cortes.

References 

Textile artists
Tapestry artists
Spanish embroiderers
21st-century women textile artists
21st-century textile artists
20th-century women textile artists
20th-century textile artists
Spanish textile artists
Living people
Year of birth missing (living people)